Mark O'Keefe (born July 10, 1952) is an American soldier and politician. He is a member of the Democratic Party.

Early life and career
Mark David O'Keefe was born in Pittston, Pennsylvania.  In 1970, he graduated from Bishop Egan High School in Fairless Hills, Pennsylvania. O'Keefe served in the United States Army as a paratrooper from 1971 to 1973. In 1977, he received his bachelor's degree in environmental studies from California State University, Sacramento and his master's degree in environmental studies from University of Montana in 1984.

O'Keefe worked for the Montana Department of Natural Resources. O'Keefe married Lucy Bliss Dayton, daughter of Bruce Dayton and great-granddaughter of George Dayton on September 24, 1983. O'Keefe lives with his wife and family in Helena, Montana. He was also a consultant concerning natural resources and politician campaigns.

Political career

O'Keefe served in the Montana House of Representatives from 1988 to 1992 and was a Democrat. From 1992 to 2000, he served as Montana State Auditor. In his run for auditor in 1992, he defeated Representative Fred Thomas, receiving 55% of the vote.

In the November General Election 2000, O'Keefe ran for Governor of Montana against the Republican candidate Judy Martz and lost the election to Martz.

References

1952 births
Living people
California State University, Sacramento alumni
Democratic Party members of the Montana House of Representatives
Military personnel from Pennsylvania
People from Pittston, Pennsylvania
Politicians from Helena, Montana
University of Montana alumni